The Antarctic Ice Marathon was established by Richard Donovan and Polar Running Adventures to enable marathon runners to complete a marathon on all seven continents. It also enables athletes to complete the marathon grand slam – a marathon on all seven continents and the North Pole.

Runnings of the Antarctic Ice Marathon and  race have taken place at 80° south just a few hundred miles from the South Pole at the foot of the Ellsworth Mountains. Participants are flown from Punta Arenas, Chile to the race location in the interior of the Antarctic and experience sub-zero temperatures and 24 hours of daylight while there.

Results

Other Events 

2007

 80 South Half-Marathon Winner – Mahe Bertrand 
 Wheelchair Marathon Winner – Tan William 

2008

 White Continent Half-Marathon Winner – Frank Staples 

2011

 100 Mile Polar Centenary Run – Richard Donovan 

2014

 Antarctic 10 km Winner – Phillipe Laurent 

2018

 Women's 10K Winner – Annie Young 
 Men's 5K Winner – Hua Xie 

2019

 Women's 10K Winner – Nancy Driscoll

See also
2006 Antarctic Ice Marathon
Antarctica Marathon (1995)
The Last Desert
North Pole Marathon

References

External links
 Antarctic Ice Marathon website
 North Pole Marathon website
 Final Preparations For Antarctic Ice Marathon & 100k
 Pictures of the North Pole Marathon from Rob Plijnaar, competitor in 2009

Sports in Antarctica
Marathons
Recurring sporting events established in 2006
2006 establishments in Antarctica